The 2013 NHL Entry Draft was the 51st NHL Entry Draft. All seven rounds of the draft took place on June 30, 2013, at the Prudential Center in Newark, New Jersey. The top three selections were Nathan MacKinnon going to the Colorado Avalanche, Aleksander Barkov going to the Florida Panthers, and Jonathan Drouin going to the Tampa Bay Lightning.

Eligibility
Ice hockey players born between January 1, 1993, and September 15, 1995, were eligible for selection in the 2013 NHL Entry Draft. Additionally, un-drafted, non-North American players born in 1992 were eligible for the draft; and those players who were drafted in the 2011 NHL Entry Draft, but not signed by an NHL team and who were born after June 30, 1993, were also eligible to re-enter the draft.

Draft lottery
Beginning with the 2013 NHL Entry Draft, all 14 teams not qualifying for the Stanley Cup playoffs had a "weighted" chance at winning the first overall selection. The Colorado Avalanche won the 2013 draft lottery that took place on April 29, 2013, thus moving them up from the second pick to the first pick.

Top prospects
Source: NHL Central Scouting final (April 24, 2013) ranking.

Selections by round
The order of the 2013 Entry Draft is listed below.

Round one

Notes
 The New Jersey Devils' first-round pick went to the Vancouver Canucks as the result of a trade on June 30, 2013, that sent Cory Schneider to New Jersey in exchange for this pick.
 The Minnesota Wild's first-round pick went to the Buffalo Sabres as the result of trade on April 3, 2013, that sent Jason Pominville and a fourth-round pick in 2014 to Minnesota in exchange for Matt Hackett, Johan Larsson, a second-round pick in 2014 and this pick.
 The Detroit Red Wings' first-round pick went to the San Jose Sharks as the result of a trade on June 30, 2013, that sent a first-round pick in 2013 (20th overall) and Pittsburgh's second-round pick in 2013 (58th overall) to Detroit in exchange for this pick.
 The New York Rangers' first-round pick went to the Columbus Blue Jackets as the result of a trade on July 23, 2012, that sent Rick Nash, Steven Delisle and a conditional third-round pick in 2013 to New York in exchange for Artem Anisimov, Brandon Dubinsky, Tim Erixon and this pick.
 The San Jose Sharks' first-round pick went to the Detroit Red Wings as the result of a trade on June 30, 2013, that sent a first-round pick in 2013 (18th overall) to San Jose in exchange Pittsburgh's second-round pick in 2013 (58th overall) and this pick.
 The St. Louis Blues' first-round pick went to the Calgary Flames as the result of a trade on April 1, 2013, that sent Jay Bouwmeester to St. Louis in exchange for Mark Cundari, Reto Berra, and this pick (being conditional at the time of the trade). The condition – Calgary will receive St. Louis' first-round pick in 2013 if St. Louis qualifies for the 2013 Stanley Cup playoffs – was converted on April 23, 2013.
 The Los Angeles Kings' first-round pick went to the Columbus Blue Jackets as a result of a trade on February 23, 2012, that sent Jeff Carter to Los Angeles in exchange for Jack Johnson and this pick (being conditional at the time of the trade). One condition was converted on April 5, 2012, when Los Angeles qualified for the 2012 Stanley Cup playoffs, giving Columbus the right to choose between Los Angeles' first-round picks in either 2012 or 2013. The other condition was converted on June 22, 2012, when Columbus chose not to take Los Angeles' first round pick in 2012, giving them this pick.
The Pittsburgh Penguins' first-round pick went to the Calgary Flames as the result of a trade on March 27, 2013, that sent Jarome Iginla to Pittsburgh in exchange for Kenny Agostino, Ben Hanowski and this pick.
 The Boston Bruins' first-round pick went to the Dallas Stars as the result of a trade on April 2, 2013, that sent Jaromir Jagr to Boston in exchange for Lane MacDermid, Cody Payne and this pick (being conditional at the time of the trade). The condition – Dallas will receive a first-round pick if Boston advances to the 2013 Eastern Conference Finals – was converted on May 25, 2013.

Round two

Notes
 The Nashville Predators' second-round pick went to the Montreal Canadiens as the result of a trade on February 27, 2012, that sent Andrei Kostitsyn to Nashville in exchange for the cancellation of a previously arranged conditional fifth-round pick (in a 2012 trade of Hal Gill to Nashville from Montreal) in 2013 and this pick.
 The Carolina Hurricanes' second-round pick went to the Buffalo Sabres as the result of a trade on June 30, 2013, that sent Andrej Sekera to Carolina in exchange for Jamie McBain and this pick.
 The Calgary Flames' second-round pick went to the Montreal Canadiens as the result of a trade on January 12, 2012, that sent Michael Cammalleri, Karri Ramo and Montreal's fifth-round pick in 2012 to Calgary in exchange for Rene Bourque, Patrick Holland and this pick.
 The Edmonton Oilers' second-round pick went to the Los Angeles Kings as the result of a trade on June 30, 2013, that sent a second and third-round pick in 2013 (57th and 88th overall) and Carolina's fourth-round pick in 2013 (96th overall) to Edmonton in exchange for this pick.
 The New Jersey Devils' second-round pick went to the Phoenix Coyotes as the result of a trade on June 30, 2013, that sent second and third-round picks in 2013 (42nd and 73rd overall) to New Jersey in exchange for this pick.
 The Phoenix Coyotes' second-round pick went to the New Jersey Devils as the result of a trade on June 30, 2013, that sent a second-round pick in 2013 (39th overall) to Phoenix in exchange for a third-round pick in 2013 (73rd overall) and this pick.
 The Columbus Blue Jackets' second-round pick went to the Pittsburgh Penguins as the result of a trade on June 30, 2013, that sent San Jose's second-round pick in 2013 (50th overall) and a third-round pick in 2013 (89th overall) to Columbus in exchange for this pick.
 The New York Islanders' second-round pick went to the Anaheim Ducks as the result of a trade on June 22, 2012, that sent Lubomir Visnovsky to New York in exchange for this pick.
 The Ottawa Senators' second-round pick went to the St. Louis Blues as the result of a trade on February 26, 2012, that sent Ben Bishop to Ottawa in exchange for this pick.
 The New York Rangers' second-round pick went to the San Jose Sharks as the result of a trade on April 2, 2013, that sent Ryane Clowe to New York in exchange for Florida's third-round pick in 2013, a conditional second-round pick in 2014 and this pick.
 The San Jose Sharks' second-round pick went to the Columbus Blue Jackets as the result of a trade on June 30, 2013, that sent a second-round pick in 2013 (44th overall) to Pittsburgh in exchange for a third-round pick in 2013 (89th overall) and this pick.
Pittsburgh previously acquired this pick as the result of a trade on June 30, 2013, that sent Tyler Kennedy to San Jose in exchange for this pick.
 The Toronto Maple Leafs' second-round pick went to the Chicago Blackhawks as the result of a trade on June 30, 2013, that sent Dave Bolland to Toronto in exchange for Anaheim's fourth-round pick in 2013 (117th overall), a fourth-round pick in 2014 and this pick.
 The St. Louis Blues' second-round pick went to the Buffalo Sabres as the result of a trade on March 30, 2013, that sent Jordan Leopold to St. Louis in exchange for a conditional fifth-round pick in 2013 and this pick.
 The Vancouver Canucks' second-round pick went to the Dallas Stars as the result of a trade on April 2, 2013, that sent Derek Roy to Vancouver in exchange for Kevin Connauton and this pick.
 The Anaheim Ducks' second-round pick went to the Edmonton Oilers as the result of a trade on July 12, 2011, that sent Andrew Cogliano to Anaheim in exchange for this pick.
 The Los Angeles Kings' second-round pick went to the St. Louis Blues as the result of a trade on June 30, 2013, that sent Tampa Bay's fourth-round pick in 2013 (94th overall) and St. Louis' third and fourth-round picks in 2013 (83rd and 113th overall) to Edmonton in exchange for this pick.
Edmonton previously acquired this pick as the result of a trade on June 30, 2013, that sent a second-round pick in 2013 (37th overall) to Los Angeles in exchange for a third-round pick in 2013 (88th overall), Carolina's fourth-round pick in 2013 (96th overall) and this pick.
 The Pittsburgh Penguins' second-round pick went to the Detroit Red Wings as a result of a trade on June 30, 2013, that sent a first round pick in 2013 (18th overall) to San Jose in return for a first round pick in 2013 (20th overall) and this pick.
San Jose previously acquired this pick as the result of a trade on March 25, 2013, that sent Douglas Murray to Pittsburgh in exchange for a conditional second-round pick in 2014 and this pick.
 The Winnipeg Jets received the 29th pick of this round (59th overall) as compensation for not signing 2008 first-round draft pick Daultan Leveille.
 The Chicago Blackhawks' second-round pick went to the Washington Capitals as the result of a trade on June 30, 2013, that sent Washington's third and fourth-round picks in 2013 (84th and 114th overall) and Calgary's fifth-round pick in 2013 (127th overall) to Winnipeg in exchange for this pick.
Winnipeg previously acquired this pick as the result of a trade on June 30, 2013, that sent Johnny Oduya to Chicago in exchange for Chicago's third-round pick in 2013 and this pick.

Round three

Notes
 The Florida Panthers' third-round pick went to the Phoenix Coyotes as the result of a trade on April 3, 2013, that sent Raffi Torres to San Jose in exchange for this pick.
San Jose previously acquired this pick as the result of a trade on April 2, 2013, that sent Ryane Clowe to the New York Rangers in exchange for New York's second-round pick in 2013, a conditional second-round pick in 2014 and this pick.
New York previously acquired this pick as the result of a trade on February 25, 2012, that sent Wojtek Wolski to Florida in exchange for Michael Vernace and this pick.
 The Tampa Bay Lightning's third-round pick went to the Nashville Predators as the result of a trade on June 15, 2012, that sent Anders Lindback, Kyle Wilson and Nashville's seventh-round pick in 2012 to Tampa Bay in exchange for Sebastien Caron, Minnesota and Philadelphia's second-round picks in 2012 and this pick.
 The Nashville Predators' third-round pick went to the New York Rangers as the result of a trade on June 23, 2012, that sent New York's third-round pick in 2012 to Nashville in exchange for this pick.
 The Edmonton Oilers' third-round pick went to the Dallas Stars as the result of a trade on January 14, 2013, that sent Mark Fistric to Edmonton in exchange for this pick.
 The New Jersey Devils' third-round pick went to the New York Islanders as the result of a trade on June 30, 2013, that sent Nino Niederreiter to Minnesota in exchange for Cal Clutterbuck and this pick.
Minnesota previously acquired this pick as the result of a trade on February 24, 2012, that sent Marek Zidlicky to New Jersey in exchange for Kurtis Foster, Nick Palmieri, Stephane Veilleux, Washington's second-round pick in 2012 and this pick (being conditional at the time of the trade). The conditions – New Jersey make the Eastern Conference Finals of the 2012 Stanley Cup playoffs, Zidlicky plays in 75 percent of New Jersey's games in the first two rounds – were converted on May 9, 2012.
The Dallas Stars' third-round pick went the Montreal Canadiens as the result of a trade February 26, 2013, that sent Erik Cole to Dallas in exchange for Michael Ryder and this pick.
 The Phoenix Coyotes' third-round pick went to the New Jersey Devils as the result of a trade on June 30, 2013, that sent a second-round pick in 2013 (39th overall) to Phoenix in exchange for a second-round pick in 2013 (42nd overall) and this pick.
 The Winnipeg Jets' third-round pick went to the Chicago Blackhawks as the result of a trade on June 30, 2013, that sent Michael Frolik to Winnipeg in exchange for a fifth-round pick in 2013 (134th overall) and this pick.
 The Columbus Blue Jackets' third-round pick went to the New York Rangers as the result of a trade on July 23, 2012, that sent Artem Anisimov, Brandon Dubinsky, Tim Erixon and a first-round pick in 2013 to Columbus in exchange for Rick Nash, Steven Delisle and this pick (being conditional at the time of the trade). The condition – New York will not advance to the 2013 Stanley Cup Finals – was converted on May 25, 2013.
 The Minnesota Wild's third-round pick went to the Pittsburgh Penguins as the result of a trade on March 24, 2013, that sent Joe Morrow and a fifth-round pick in 2013 to Dallas in exchange for Brenden Morrow and this pick (being conditional at the time of the trade). The condition – Pittsburgh will receive the lower of either Edmonton or Minnesota's previously acquired third-round picks, via Dallas – was converted on April 21, 2013.
Dallas previously acquired this pick as the result of a trade on February 16, 2012, that sent Nicklas Grossmann to Philadelphia in exchange for Los Angeles' second-round pick in 2012 and this pick.
Philadelphia previously acquired this pick as the result of a trade on June 27, 2011, that sent Darroll Powe to Minnesota in exchange for this pick.
 The San Jose Sharks' third-round pick went to the Minnesota Wild as the result of a trade on August 6, 2011, that sent James Sheppard to San Jose in exchange for this pick.
 The St. Louis Blues' third-round pick went to the Edmonton Oilers as the result of a trade on June 30, 2013, that sent Los Angeles' second-round pick in 2013 (57th overall) to St. Louis in exchange for Tampa Bay's fourth-round pick in 2013 (94th overall), a fourth-round pick in 2013 (113th overall) and this pick.
 The Washington Capitals' third-round pick went to the Winnipeg Jets as the result of a trade on June 30, 2013, that sent Chicago's second-round pick in 2013 (61st overall) to Washington in exchange for a fourth-round pick in 2013 (114th overall), Calgary's fifth-round pick in 2013 (127th overall) and this pick.
 The Vancouver Canucks' third-round pick was re-acquired from the Florida Panthers as the result of a trade on October 22, 2011, that sent Mikael Samuelsson and Marco Sturm to Florida in exchange for David Booth, Steven Reinprecht and this pick.
Florida previously acquired the pick as the result of a trade on February 28, 2011, that sent Chris Higgins to Vancouver in exchange for Evan Oberg and this pick.
 The Los Angeles Kings' third-round pick went to the Edmonton Oilers as the result of a trade on June 30, 2013, that sent a second-round pick in 2013 (37th overall) to Los Angeles in exchange for a second-round pick in 2013 (57th overall), Carolina's fourth-round pick in 2013 (96th overall) and this pick.
 The Pittsburgh Penguins' third-round pick went to the Columbus Blue Jackets as the result of a trade on June 30, 2013, that sent a second-round pick in 2013 (44th overall) to Pittsburgh in exchange for San Jose's second-round pick in 2013 (50th overall) and this pick.
 The Chicago Blackhawks' third-round pick went to the Winnipeg Jets as the result of a trade on February 27, 2012, that sent Johnny Oduya to Chicago in exchange for Chicago's second-round pick in 2013 and this pick.

Round four

Notes
 The Tampa Bay Lightning's fourth-round pick went to the Edmonton Oilers as the result of a trade on June 30, 2013, that sent Los Angeles' second-round pick in 2013 (57th overall) to St. Louis in exchange for a third and fourth-round pick in 2013 (83rd and 113th overall) and this pick.
St. Louis previously acquired this pick as the result of a trade on July 10, 2012, that sent B. J. Crombeen and a fifth-round pick in 2014 to Tampa Bay in exchange for a fourth-round pick in 2014 and this pick.
 The Carolina Hurricanes' fourth-round pick went to the Edmonton Oilers as the result of a trade on June 30, 2013, that sent a second-round pick in 2013 (37th overall) to Los Angeles in exchange for a second and third-round pick in 2013 (57th and 88th overall) and this pick.
Los Angeles previously acquired this pick as the result of a trade on January 13, 2013, that sent Kevin Westgarth to Carolina in exchange for Anthony Stewart, a 6th round pick in 2014, and this pick.
 The Calgary Flames' fourth-round pick went to the Florida Panthers as the result of a trade on June 18, 2013, that sent Corban Knight to Calgary in exchange for this pick.
 The Edmonton Oilers' fourth-round pick went to the Florida Panthers as the result of a trade on April 3, 2013 at sent Jerred Smithson to the Oilers in exchange for this pick.
 The Buffalo Sabres' fourth-round pick went to the Nashville Predators as the result of a trade on February 27, 2012, that sent Nashville's first-round pick in 2012 to Buffalo in exchange for Paul Gaustad and this pick.
 The Philadelphia Flyers' fourth-round pick went to the Ottawa Senators as the result of a trade on April 3, 2013, that sent Ben Bishop to Tampa Bay in exchange for Cory Conacher and this pick.
Tampa Bay previously acquired this pick as the result of a trade on February 18, 2012, that sent Pavel Kubina to Philadelphia in exchange for a conditional second-round pick in either 2012 or 2013 and this pick.
 The Phoenix Coyotes' fourth-round pick went to the Los Angeles Kings as the result of a trade on February 26, 2013, that sent Simon Gagne to Philadelphia in exchange for this pick (being conditional at the time of the trade). The condition – Los Angeles will receive a fourth-round pick in 2013 if Philadelphia fails to make the 2013 Stanley Cup Playoffs – was converted on April 19, 2013.
Philadelphia previously acquired this pick as a result of a trade on June 22, 2012, that sent Sergei Bobrovsky to Columbus in exchange for Ottawa's second-round pick in 2012, Vancouver's fourth-round pick in 2012, and this pick.
Columbus previously acquired this pick as a result of a trade on February 22, 2012, that sent Antoine Vermette to Phoenix in exchange for Curtis McElhinney, Ottawa's second-round pick in 2012 and this pick (being conditional at the time of the trade). The condition - Phoenix wins at least one round in the 2012 Stanley Cup playoffs - was converted on April 23, 2012.
 The San Jose Sharks' fourth-round pick went to the Chicago Blackhawks as the result of a trade on June 30, 2013, that sent Anaheim's fourth-round pick in 2013 (117th overall) and a fifth-round pick in 2013 (151st overall) to San Jose in exchange for a fifth-round pick in 2014 and this pick.
San Jose previously re-acquired this pick as the result of a trade on April 1, 2013, that sent Michal Handzus to Chicago in exchange for this pick.
Chicago previously acquired this pick as the result of a trade on June 23, 2012, that sent Chicago's fourth-round pick in 2012 to San Jose in exchange for Tampa Bay's seventh-round pick in 2012 and this pick.
 The Toronto Maple Leafs' fourth-round pick went to the St. Louis Blues as the result of a trade on June 30, 2013, that sent a seventh-round pick in 2013 (203rd overall) and a fourth-round pick in 2014 to Nashville in exchange for this pick.
Nashville previously acquired this pick as the result of a trade on July 3, 2011, that sent Cody Franson and Matthew Lombardi to Toronto in exchange for Brett Lebda, Robert Slaney and this pick (being conditional at the time of the trade). The condition – Lombardi plays in 60 or more regular season games over the course of the 2011–12 and 2012–13 NHL seasons – was converted on April 3, 2012.
 The St. Louis Blues' fourth-round pick went to the Edmonton Oilers as the result of a trade on June 30, 2013, that sent Los Angeles' second-round pick in 2013 (57th overall) to St. Louis in exchange for a third-round pick in 2013 (83rd overall), Tampa Bay's fourth-round pick in 2013 (94th overall) and this pick.
 The Washington Capitals' fourth-round pick went to the Winnipeg Jets as the result of a trade on June 30, 2013, that sent Chicago's second-round pick in 2013 (61st overall) to Washington in exchange for a third-round pick in 2013 (84th overall), Calgary's fifth-round pick in 2013 (127th overall) and this pick.
 The Anaheim Ducks' fourth-round pick went to the San Jose Sharks as the result of a trade on June 30, 2013, that sent a fourth-round pick in 2013 (111th overall) and a fifth-round pick in 2014 to Chicago in exchange for a fifth-round pick in 2013 (151st overall) and this pick.
Chicago previously acquired this pick as the result of a trade on June 30, 2013, that sent Dave Bolland to Toronto in exchange for a second-round pick in 2013 (51st overall), a fourth-round pick in 2014 and this pick.
Toronto previously acquired this pick as the result of a trade on February 9, 2011, that sent Francois Beauchemin to Anaheim in exchange for Joffrey Lupul, Jake Gardiner and this pick (being conditional at the time of the trade). The condition – Toronto will receive a fourth-round pick if Joffrey Lupul is on the roster for 40 or more games in the 2012–13 season with the club – was converted on April 10, 2013.

Round five

Notes
 The Calgary Flames' fifth-round pick went to the Winnipeg Jets as the result of a trade on June 30, 2013, that sent Chicago's second-round pick in 2013 (61st overall) to Washington in exchange for a third and fourth-round pick in 2013 (84th and 114th overall) and this pick.
Washington previously acquired this pick as the result of a trade on June 27, 2012, that sent Dennis Wideman to Calgary in exchange for Jordan Henry and this pick.
 The New Jersey Devils' fifth-round pick went to the Buffalo Sabres as the result of a trade on March 15, 2013, that sent T. J. Brennan to Florida in exchange for this pick.
Florida previously acquired this pick as the result of a trade on February 8, 2013, that sent Keaton Ellerby to Los Angeles in exchange for this pick.
Los Angeles previously acquired this pick as the result of a trade on February 6, 2013, that sent Andrei Loktionov to New Jersey in exchange for this pick.
 The Winnipeg Jets' fifth-round pick went to the Chicago Blackhawks as the result of a trade on June 30, 2013, that sent Michael Frolik to Winnipeg in exchange for a third-round pick in 2013 (74th overall) and this pick.
 The Columbus Blue Jackets' fifth-round pick went to the Calgary Flames as the result of a trade on April 3, 2013, that sent Blake Comeau to Columbus in exchange for this pick.
 The New York Rangers' fifth-round pick went to the Nashville Predators as the result of a trade on June 23, 2012, that sent Nashville's fifth-round pick in 2012 to New York in exchange for this pick.
 The St. Louis Blues' fifth-round pick went to the Buffalo Sabres as the result of a trade on March 30, 2013, that sent Jordan Leopold to St. Louis in exchange for a second-round pick in 2013 and this pick (being conditional at the time of the trade). The condition – Buffalo will receive a fifth-round pick in 2013 if St. Louis fails to advance to the second round of the 2013 Stanley Cup playoffs – was converted on May 10, 2013.
 The Montreal Canadiens' fifth-round pick went to the Los Angeles Kings as the result of a trade on April 2, 2013, that sent Davis Drewiske to Montreal in exchange for this pick.
 The Pittsburgh Penguins' fifth-round pick went to the Dallas Stars as the result of a trade on March 24, 2013, that sent Brenden Morrow and Minnesota's third-round pick in 2013 to Pittsburgh in exchange for Joe Morrow and this pick.
 The Chicago Blackhawks' fifth-round pick went to the San Jose Sharks as the result of a trade on June 30, 2013, that sent a fourth-round pick in 2013 (111th overall) and a fifth-round pick in 2014 to Chicago in exchange for Anaheim's fourth-round pick in 2013 (117th overall) and this pick.

Round six

Notes
 The Dallas Stars' sixth-round pick went to the Ottawa Senators as the result of a trade on June 7, 2013, that sent Sergei Gonchar to Dallas in exchange for this pick (being conditional at the time of the trade). The condition – Ottawa will receive a sixth-round pick in 2013 if Gonchar signs with Dallas prior to the 2013 NHL Entry Draft – was converted on June 8, 2013.
 The Winnipeg Jets' sixth-round pick went to the Pittsburgh Penguins as the result of a trade on February 13, 2013, that sent Eric Tangradi to Winnipeg in exchange for this pick (being conditional at the time of the trade). The condition – Pittsburgh will receive a sixth-round pick in 2013 if Tangradi plays a certain number of games for Winnipeg – the date of conversion in unknown.
 The San Jose Sharks' sixth-round pick went to the Nashville Predators as the result of a trade on April 3, 2013, that sent Scott Hannan to San Jose in exchange for this pick (being conditional at the time of the trade). The condition – Nashville will receive a sixth-round pick in 2013 if Hannan appears in one playoff game in the 2013 Stanley Cup playoffs for the Sharks – was converted on May 1, 2013.

Round seven

Notes
 The Florida Panthers' seventh-round pick went to the Dallas Stars as the result of a trade on June 23, 2012, that sent Dallas' seventh-round pick in 2012 to Florida in exchange for this pick.
 The Carolina Hurricanes' seventh-round pick went the Tampa Bay Lightning as the result of a trade on April 2, 2013, that sent Marc-Andre Bergeron to Carolina in exchange for Adam Hall and this pick.
 The New Jersey Devils' seventh-round pick went to the Winnipeg Jets as the result of a trade on February 13, 2013, that sent Alexei Ponikarovsky to New Jersey in exchange for a fourth-round pick in 2014 and this pick.
 The Dallas Stars' seventh-round pick went to the Los Angeles Kings as the result of a trade on June 23, 2012, that sent Edmonton's seventh-round pick in 2012 to Dallas in exchange for this pick.
 The Ottawa Senators' seventh-round pick went to the Calgary Flames as the result of a trade on January 21, 2013, that sent Henrik Karlsson to Chicago in exchange for this pick.
Chicago previously acquired this pick as the result of a trade on December 2, 2011, that sent Rob Klinkhammer to Ottawa in exchange for this pick (being conditional at the time of the trade). The condition – Klinkhammer plays at least five 2011–12 regular season games for Ottawa – was converted on March 14, 2012 when Klinkhammer appeared in a game against the Montreal Canadiens.
 The New York Rangers' seventh-round pick went to the Minnesota Wild as the result of a trade on February 3, 2012, that sent Casey Wellman to New York in exchange for Erik Christensen and this pick (being conditional at the time of the trade). The condition - Christensen is not re-signed by Minnesota for the 2012–13 NHL season - was converted on June 5, 2012 when Christensen signed with HC Lev Praha of the KHL.
 The St. Louis Blues' seventh-round pick went to the Nashville Predators as the result of a trade on June 30, 2013, that sent Toronto's fourth-round pick in 2013 (112th overall) to St. Louis in exchange for a fourth-round pick in 2014 and this pick.
 The Montreal Canadiens' seventh-round pick went to the Florida Panthers as the result of a trade on June 30, 2013, that sent a seventh-round pick in 2014 to Montreal in exchange for this pick.
 The Anaheim Ducks' seventh-round pick went to the San Jose Sharks as the result of a trade on February 27, 2012, that sent Jamie McGinn, Mike Connolly and Michael Sgarbossa to Colorado in exchange for Daniel Winnik, TJ Galiardi and this pick.
Colorado previously acquired this pick as the result of a trade on October 8, 2011, that sent Kyle Cumiskey to Anaheim in exchange for Jake Newton and this pick (being conditional at the time of the trade). The condition – Cumiskey plays in less than 45 2011–12 regular season games for Anaheim – was converted on January 4, 2012 when Cumiskey did not play in Anaheim's first 38 games of the season.
 The Los Angeles Kings' seventh-round pick went to the New Jersey Devils as the result of a trade on June 30, 2013, that sent a seventh-round pick in 2015 to Los Angeles in exchange for this pick.

Draftees based on nationality

North American draftees by state/province

See also
 2010–11 NHL transactions
 2011–12 NHL transactions
 2012–13 NHL transactions
 2013–14 NHL season
 List of first overall NHL draft picks
 List of NHL players

References

External links
Official Site
2013 NHL Entry Draft player stats at The Internet Hockey Database

Draft
National Hockey League Entry Draft
NHL Entry Draft
Ice hockey in New Jersey
Sports in Newark, New Jersey
National Hockey League in the New York metropolitan area